The 1918 Bridgwater by-election was held on 18 June 1918.  The by-election was held due to the incumbent Conservative MP, Robert Sanders, becoming Treasurer of the Household.  It was retained by Sanders who was unopposed due to a War-time electoral pact.

References

1918 elections in the United Kingdom
1918 in England
20th century in Somerset
June 1918 events
Bridgwater
By-elections to the Parliament of the United Kingdom in Somerset constituencies
Unopposed ministerial by-elections to the Parliament of the United Kingdom in English constituencies